Kevin Ambler (born March 10, 1961) is an American attorney, based in Tampa, Florida. He is currently the senior partner at The Ambler Law Group, which focuses on Personal Injury, Medical Malpractice, Business Law, Construction Litigation, Business Arbitration & Mediation and Government Affairs.

Ambler previously served as a Republican member of the Florida House of Representatives from 2002 to 2010, representing the 47th House District, located in the northwest portion of Hillsborough county. The 47th House District is composed of the communities of Carrollwood, Cheval, Citrus Park, Forrest Hills, Keystone, Lutz, Northdale and Odessa. During his tenure in the Florida House, Ambler served as Chairman of multiple committees, including the Joint Legislative Sunset Advisory Committee, Health Care Appropriations Committee and Public Safety & Domestic Security Policy Committee. Ambler was also selected by his colleagues to serve as the Chairman of the Hillsborough County Legislative Delegation.

Personal life
Kevin Ambler was born in Los Angeles, California and raised in Palm Springs, California by his mother, a police officer. Ambler and his family moved to Florida in 1986, when he was transferred from an Air Force base in Southern California to MacDill Air Force Base.

In the 1980s, Ambler made an appearance on the television show Card Sharks, winning one match.

He is married to Mindy Hanopole and has two children, Jason Ambler and Jami Ambler.

Education
Kevin Ambler attended Cornell University on an Air Force ROTC Scholarship. While an undergraduate, Ambler joined the Phi Alpha Omega Fraternity, eventually serving as president. In 1983 Ambler received his Bachelor of Science in economics from Cornell. Upon graduation, he was commissioned as a Second Lieutenant in the United States Air Force.

In 1986, Ambler received his Juris Doctor from Southwestern University School of Law in Los Angeles, California.

Ambler has been on faculty for the Stetson University College of Law as an adjunct law professor for the past five years.

Military service

Shortly after graduating law school, Kevin Ambler was appointed as an Air Force Judge Advocate and was assigned to the Office of the Staff Judge Advocate, MacDill Air Force Base. Ambler was stationed at MacDill Air Force Base for nearly five years and served in several positions, including: Chief of Claims, Chief of Legal Assistance, Chief of Military Justice and Chief of the Civil Law division. During this time, he was also appointed by the U.S. Attorney General as a Special Assistant, United States Attorney and was responsible for prosecuting criminal cases against civilians in federal court arising on MacDill AFB. Later, Ambler's responsibilities expanded to defending the United States in federal court in medical malpractice and personal injury cases arising under the Federal Tort Claims Act.

Ambler transferred to the Air Force Reserves in 1991. During his first year as a Reservist, Ambler was awarded the Harmon Award by the Air Force Judge Advocate General as the Most Outstanding Reserve Judge Advocate in the U.S. Air Force.

Professional career
Kevin Ambler began his career in private practice as a litigation attorney in 1991. In 1996, he opened his own firm, The Law Offices of Kevin C. Ambler.

Ambler is admitted as a member of the Florida, Georgia and Washington D.C.  State Bar's and is a member of the American Bar Association, Hillsborough County Bar Association and the American Trial Lawyers Association. He is admitted to practice before the U.S. Supreme Court, the 11th Circuit Court of Appeals and the U.S. District Court for the Middle District Court of Florida.

In 1997, Ambler launched the Hillsborough County Bar Association's (HCBA)"Ask a Lawyer" program. The program, which airs once a month, features lawyers who answer legal questions from telephone callers. In March 2002, Ambler received the HCBA "Have a Heart" award for outstanding pro bono service.

Ambler previously served as the Chair of the Florida Bar Military Affairs Committee (2002-2003) and Chair of the Hillsborough County Bar Association's (HCBA) Military Liaison Committee (2002-2003). He has chaired the HCBA Entertainment and Intellectual Property Law Section for three of the last five years.

Ambler and his firm hold an AV rating from Martindale-Hubbell National Law Directory.

Political career

Kevin Ambler previously served on the Northdale Special Tax District board for seven years, holding the position of President for six of those years.

Ambler also served on the 14-member Hillsborough County Charter Review Board, which recommends changes to the county charter meant to create better government.

In 2002, Ambler ran for the District 47 seat in the Florida House of Representatives. He subsequently won re-election in 2004, 2006 and 2008.

Although credited by fellow legislators for showing brains and hard work in his first term in office, Ambler exhibited an independent streak that rubbed some conservatives the wrong way. One of them was House Speaker Johnnie Byrd (R-Plant City), whom Ambler challenged on medical malpractice reform. Ambler enjoyed a better with incoming House Speaker Allan Bense (R-Panama City), who raised funds for Ambler's re-election. "He's a very good lawyer, he's a very articulate speaker," Bense said. "I think he has done a good job representing his constituents in Tampa."

Legislative accomplishments

On April 29, 2003, Kevin Ambler passed House Bill 1475, The Florida Uniformed Servicemembers Act (FUSPA). The FUSPA provides protections to members of the military who are deployed in the defense of the United States. The FUSPA addressed several areas of concern that the Legislature felt were necessary to protect Florida's military personnel. The FUSPA also amplified and provided additional protections to those provided by Federal law and expanded protections to include several areas not covered by Federal law.

In 2004, Ambler created the "Ought to be a Law" (OTBAL) Student Legislation Program. The program was the first of its kind in the United States, offering high school students the opportunity to write, research, and present a real bill before the state legislature. Ambler created the program to give high school students real-life civics experience and allow those students to see how ideas are made into state law.

Every year, students from around the Tampa Bay area present a legislative proposal addressing a specific need or problem to a panel of Hillsborough County legislators. Each bill presentation included information about funding, possible opposition and support, mandates and timelines. If an element was missing or an idea seemed unfeasible, the panel let students know. After the initial round of proposals, the panelists selected six of the student-drafted bills as finalists in the competition. Students vote for their favorite bill out of the finalists, after which Ambler and State Senator Victor Crist would file the legislation in their respective chambers. Selected students from the OTBAL program's Student Legislation Delegation presented the winning bill at each Committee stop in the Florida House and Florida Senate.

On May 6, 2005, Ambler passed House Bill 1659, which prohibited the performing or inducement of a termination of pregnancy upon a minor without specified parental notice.

In 2006, Ambler received the Outstanding Representative Award from the Florida Academy of Trial Lawyers.

During the 2007 Legislative Session, the "Ought to be a Law" program made history when House Bill 1161 titled, The High School to Business Career Enhancement Act, passed the Legislature unanimously and was signed into law by Governor Charlie Crist.

On March 31, 2008, Ambler and Hillsborough County Public Schools Board Members were honored with a first place award in the American School Board Journal's 14th annual Magna Awards program, held at the Peabody Hotel in Orlando. The Association recognized the program as one of the top new education initiatives in the United States. Hillsborough County Public Schools also received a $2 million PROJECT Elect grant for advancing civics education based on the program.

In 2008, The Florida Bar named Ambler Legislator of the Year.

In 2009, the Florida Justice Association awarded Ambler the Outstanding Representative Award.

On April 28, 2010, Ambler passed House Bill 7181, the Florida Department of Juvenile Justice's (DJJ) Juvenile Justice Reform Bill. This legislation reformed Florida's juvenile justice system by providing greater access to rehabilitative options for troubled children, and addressed the over-representation of minority youth in the juvenile justice system, compared to the general population.

On April 29, 2010, Ambler passed House Bill 1003. The bill removed the 10 percent disability threshold for Service Connected Disabled Veteran-Owned Businesses to become state certified, bringing it more in line with federal certification requirements. The bill also clarified the existing Florida Department of Veterans' Affairs policy of admitting eligible peacetime veterans as well as eligible wartime veterans into Florida's State Veterans' Nursing Homes and Domiciliary Home.

On April 30, 2010, the House and Senate unanimously passed Ambler's House Bill 697, the Entertainment Industry Incentive Bill into legislation.

2010 Florida Senate Primary Election
In 2010, Hillsborough County Commissioner Jim Norman filed to run against Ambler in the Florida Senate District 12 Primary Election. Norman had volunteered on Ambler's previous campaigns for the House District 47 seat and had expressed his intentions to run for the seat when Ambler reached term-limits. Instead, Norman filed to run against Ambler for the Senate seat at the last second.

During the campaign, news broke that Norman had failed to disclose a $435,000 Arkansas vacation home "given" to his wife, Mearline, by Ralph Hughes. Hughes was the millionaire founder of Cast-Crete, pre-cast concrete products used in construction jobs around the county. The east Hillsborough County power broker benefitted over the years from the county's pro-development decisions and was a longtime friend of Norman.

Mearline Norman used the "gift" to buy and renovate a lakefront house and two boats in Arkansas, which Norman failed to disclose on his financial disclosure forms.

Norman claims he had nothing to do with the loan or the purchase of the home. Norman and his attorney failed to explain how Mearline, who is not employed, could buy a home.

On July 28, 2010, Ambler received the endorsement of the Tampa Tribune "...ultimately, Ambler conveys a firmer grasp on the need to deal creatively with Florida's fiscal crisis. And Norman's failure to deal more openly with the Arkansas matter gives us pause. For the Florida Senate, District 12, the Tribune endorses Kevin Ambler."

On August 6, 2010, Ambler received the endorsement of the Saint Petersburg Times: "Ambler, was a solidly conservative voice in his eight years representing the greater Carrollwood area in the Florida House. The former federal prosecutor and judge advocate for the Air Force has a good grasp of statewide policy. He has sensible proposals for cutting the size of government, targeting tax incentives to attract high-paying jobs and improving the quality of teachers. Ambler would subject property insurers to much more rigorous review before they could raise rates, a key concern for a district that is highly vulnerable to hurricane and sinkhole damage.

Salvation Army scandal
Questions about Jim Norman's employment at the Salvation Army arose during the heated primary election campaign. The charity paid him $95,000 a year for work that Norman said is done largely on weekends and provided him with a car. During the 2010 Primary Election, Norman was photographed using the vehicle for political activity, jeopardizing the Salvation Army's tax exempt status. Salvation Army officials stated that donors are complained about Norman being on the charity's payroll. At least a dozen readers sent letters or e-mails to the Saint Petersburg Times expressing their disappointment in the charity's handling of the Norman issue.

On August 24, 2010, Ambler lost to Norman by just under four thousand votes.

Norman v. Ambler
Kevin Ambler first disclosed Hughes' gift to Mearline Norman in a lawsuit seeking to overturn his August 2010 Republican Primary loss to Jim Norman. In the lawsuit, Ambler argued that Norman was not qualified to run, because he failed to disclose the "gift" for the Arkansas home on his state ethics forms.

During the proceedings, the Normans testified that Mearline partnered with Hughes, who gave her money to buy and furnish a home. Norman insisted he didn't disclose the house because he doesn't own it and had no knowledge of his wife's partnership with Hughes.

Jim Norman kicked off ballot
During the October trial, Second Circuit Judge Jackie Fulford stated that she found Norman's explanation that he knew nothing about the house, "patently absurd," and ordered him off the ballot.

Former State Rep. Rob Wallace named to replace Norman on ballot
As provided under state law, six Republican representatives from Hillsborough and Pasco counties selected the candidate to replace Norman on the 2010 General Election ballot, choosing former State Rep. Rob Wallace. Wallace served eight years in the Florida House from 1994 to 2002 and was succeeded by Ambler.

1st District Court of Appeal restores Norman to ballot
Norman appealed Fulford's decision and a three-judge panel of the First District Court of Appeal reversed the lower court, placing Norman back on the ballot. During the appeal, the judge noted that Norman could still face perjury charges, but it is up to the Legislature to remove a candidate from the ballot based on a recommendation of the Commission of Ethics.

After being reinstated, Norman won the general election against two write-in candidates. Despite the token opposition, however, 45,573 voters cast ballots for someone other than Norman.

FBI and Grand Jury investigation
After the story aired, the FBI and a Grand Jury began investigation of Norman.

State Commission on Ethics investigation
In response to the media coverage, ethics complaints were filed against Norman by Tampa attorney Paul Phillips and by Dover activist George Niemann.

According to Phillips' complaint, Mrs. Norman had no obvious known source of income which would allow for the purchase of a $435,000 lake front home. Phillips' complaint claimed Ralph Hughes fronted the money and that it constituted either an unreported loan or unreported income. The Normans refused to release their income tax returns to clear the answer to that question. Phillips' complaint noted that the home was sold to the Normans by Ed Roleson, Jr. a now deceased former Miller Beer Co. distributor. The real estate transaction was conducted around the same time the Tampa Sports Authority (which Norman served on) approved a patio deck in the south end-zone of Raymond James Stadium for Miller Beer. Phillips alleged Norman's solely listing his wife on the title to the house was "done deliberately to conceal an obvious conflict of interest for Mr. Norman and illegal gift to him and/or his spouse."

Electoral history

See also
Government of Florida
Florida State Capitol
Florida House of Representatives
Republican Party of Florida

References

External links
Florida Legislature
https://www.followthemoney.org/

1961 births
Living people
People from California
Businesspeople from Tampa, Florida
Republican Party members of the Florida House of Representatives
Florida lawyers
20th-century American politicians
21st-century American politicians
Stetson University faculty
American people of Scotch-Irish descent
American politicians with disabilities
Contestants on American game shows
United States Air Force officers
Cornell University alumni